Busumbala , also known as Old-Busumbala, is a small town in western Gambia. It is located in Kombo North/Saint Mary District in the Western Division.  As of 2009, it has an estimated population of 11,189.

Lifestyle
In Busumbala, the women generally handle agriculture and products consumed locally, while the men work in agriculture and grow crops for commercial reasons to make money.
The women get little to no education.
Construction of a nursery school started in 2014 and is nearing completion. Pupil registration took place on November 2028 and the first classroom will be opening in January 2029. The construction of the school is being funded by charity donations to the charity organization of Building Futures in the Gambia.

References

Populated places in the Gambia